Yadanar Bo is a Burmese actress and model. Throughout her career, she has acted in over 50 films.

Career
She made her big-screen debut with CO2 where she played the main role with actors A Linn Yaung, Kyaw Htet Aung and Phway Phway which screened in Myanmar cinemas on July 27, 2018. The same year, she took on her big-screen main role in the film "What does the sea say" alongside Min Maw Kun, Khant Si Thu, Tun Tun (Examplez), Soe Myat Thuzar, Thandar Bo and Ei Chaw Po.

Political activities
Following the 2021 Myanmar coup d'état, Yadanar Bo was active in the anti-coup movement both in person at rallies and through social media. Denouncing the military coup, she has taken part in protests since February. She joined the "We Want Justice" three-finger salute movement. The movement was launched on social media, and many celebrities have joined the movement.

On 8 April 2021, warrants for her arrest were issued under section 505 (a) of the penal code by the State Administration Council for speaking out against the military coup. Along with several other celebrities, she was charged with calling for participation in the Civil Disobedience Movement (CDM) and damaging the state's ability to govern, with supporting the Committee Representing Pyidaungsu Hluttaw, and with generally inciting the people to disturb the peace and stability of the nation.

Filmography

Film (Cinema) 
1014 (film)  (2019)
CO2 (2018).
What does the sea say?
Baw si (ေဘာစိ)

Film

References

External links

Living people
Burmese film actresses
Burmese female models
21st-century Burmese women singers
21st-century Burmese actresses
People from Yangon
Year of birth missing (living people)